The School of Architecture and Design (Arc/D) is an independent professional school of the University of Kansas (KU) with programs in architecture and design.

History 

The School traces its architectural roots to 1912 when KU's School of Engineering faculty established an undergraduate degree program in architectural engineering (ARCE).  Existing faculty taught the initial architectural engineering courses, but Goldwin Goldsmith, a principal of the New York City architectural firm Van Vleck and Goldsmith, was hired as the first full-time faculty member and Chair of architectural engineering.

Eight years later, in 1920, Goldsmith and his architectural engineering department's faculty created KU's Bachelor of Architecture degree program.  Architecture and architectural engineering were in a combined department in KU's School of Engineering until 1969 when the School of Architecture and Urban Design (SAUD) was organized.  The SAUD was not departmentalized, and had three programs: architecture, architectural engineering, and urban planning. The architectural engineering program was managed jointly by the SAUD and the School of Engineering until 2001 when it merged with civil and environmental engineering, but architecture faculty still participate in teaching KU ARCEs and serve on a joint advisory committee.

To more accurately recognize the urban planning program, the SAUD changed its name to the School of Architecture and Urban Planning (SAUP).  In 2009 the design programs from the discontinued School of Fine Arts jointed the SAUP, and the school was renamed to the School of Architecture, Design, and Planning (SADP).  The other portions of the School of Fine Arts were transferred to the College of Liberal Arts and Sciences (CLAS), and a new School of Music was organized.

The Design Department traces its roots at the University of Kansas to 1885 via the creation of the Department of Art in the School of Music and Art.  The Design Department was founded in 1921.

In 2017, the Urban Planning department was merged into KU's School of Public Affairs and Administration.  Accordingly, the SADP was renamed to the School of Architecture and Design (ArcD).  A new degree program in interior design was created too as part of the newly renamed ArcD school.

International programs

Study Abroad
Australia
Denmark
England
France
Germany
Ireland
Scotland

Summer Sessions Abroad
Austria
England
Berlin, Germany (studio-based)
Siena, Italy (studio-based)
Spain

School traditions 
Studio 804, named after a graduate-level studio course, is the most visible arm of the School's design-build efforts.  Distinguished Professor Dan Rockhill has led this group for two decades, and his and the students' efforts have received many national recognitions
Recognition Ceremony—The School's graduation ceremony, held in addition to the university's Commencement Ceremony im May of each year

Facilities 
Marvin Hall—The main building of the School
Chalmers Hall—recently renamed from Art & Design
Marvin Studios
Snow Hall
Center for Design Research
Design-Build Center—Design-Build Studio and Construction Space in Lawrence's East Hills Business Park
Spencer Museum of Art—Includes the Murphy Art and Architecture Library

Deans 
Charles Howard Kahn (1969–1980) 
W. Max Lucas (1981–1993)
John Gaunt (1994–2015)
Mahesh Daas (2015–present)

Student organizations
Alpha Rho Chi (APX) architectural professional and social organization
American Institute of Architecture Students (AIAS)
U.S. Green Building Council (USGBC-student chapter)
APA-Kansas Association of Planning Students (APA/KAPS)
Industrial Designers Society of America  (IDSA)

Notable faculty 
Wojciech Lesnikowski
Victor Papanek
Dan Rockhill

References

External links 
 

Architecture schools in Kansas
University of Kansas School of Architecture and Design
Graphic design schools
Photography academics
Educational institutions established in 1969
1969 establishments in Kansas